North Florida is a region of the U.S. state of Florida comprising the northernmost part of the state. Along with South Florida and Central Florida, it is one of Florida's three most common "directional" regions. It includes Jacksonville and nearby localities in Northeast Florida, an interior region known as North Central Florida, and the Florida Panhandle.

Geography

Area
As with many vernacular regions, North Florida does not have any officially designated boundaries or status, and is defined differently in different sources. A 2007 study of Florida's regions by geographers Ary Lamme and Raymond K. Oldakowski found that Floridians surveyed identified "North Florida" as comprising the northernmost areas of the state, including both the peninsula and the Florida Panhandle. Additionally, two localized "directional" regions had emerged: North East Florida, also known as the "First Coast", representing the area around Jacksonville on the Atlantic coast, and North Central Florida, comprising the central area. North Florida is one of Florida's three most common directional regions, along with Central Florida and South Florida. The region includes smaller vernacular regions, particularly along the coast, including the Emerald Coast and the Big Bend on the Gulf Coast and the First Coast and Halifax area on the Atlantic. Lamme and Oldakowski note that the directional region is more commonly used in the interior areas than on the coast.

Enterprise Florida, the state's economic development agency, divides the state into three economic regions, used within the agency and other state and outside entities, including the Florida Department of Transportation. They identify three regions within the area identified as "North Florida" by Enterprise Florida: Northeast Florida, North Central Florida, and Northwest Florida (representing most of the Panhandle).

Regions
The following regions are entirely or partly within Northern Florida:

Directional regions:
 Northeast Florida
 North Central Florida
 Northwest Florida

Metropolitan areas:
 Jacksonville
 Pensacola
 Tallahassee
 Gainesville
 Ocala
 Fort Walton Beach
 Panama City
 Palm Coast

Vernacular regions:
 Big Bend
 Emerald Coast
 First Coast
 Florida Panhandle
 Forgotten Coast
 Halifax area
 Nature Coast

Cityscapes

Climate

Demographics
Jacksonville is the largest metropolitan area in North Florida. Its cities include St. Augustine, Orange Park, and Fernandina Beach, this area is sometimes referred to as the First Coast. Other metropolitan areas include Pensacola-Ferry Pass-Brent, Tallahassee, Gainesville, Crestview-Fort Walton Beach-Destin, Panama City-Lynn Haven, and Palm Coast. Important cities considered micropolitan areas include Lake City and Palatka.

Largest cities by population

Culture

Lamme and Oldakowski's survey identifies several demographic, political, and cultural elements that characterize North Florida and distinguish it from other areas of the state. North Floridians considered their area to be part of the South and "Dixie"; while Floridians from all parts of the state considered their area to be part of the South, people in more southern areas typically did not identify with Dixie. Additionally, residents of some parts of North Florida considered their area to be in the Bible Belt, while residents of other parts of the state did not. A popular expression of people in this region of the state goes "In Florida, the farther north you go, the farther South you are."

Politically, in contrast to Central Florida, where a majority considered their part of the state moderate, and South Florida, which was more liberal, residents of North Florida overwhelmingly (76%) considered their part of the state conservative; 16% considered it moderate and 8% considered it liberal. Lamme and Oldakowski's findings track with Barney Warf and Cynthia Waddell's studies of Florida's political geography during the 2000 Presidential election.

Lamme and Oldakowski's survey also found some cultural indicators that characterize North Florida. In general, North Florida was similar to Central Florida and differed from South Florida in these measures. In North and Central Florida, American cuisine was the most popular food, in contrast to South Florida, where ethnic foods were equally popular. Additionally, while there was little geographical variation for most styles of music, there was regional variation for both country and Latin music. Country was popular in North and Central Florida, and less so in South Florida, while Latin was less popular in North and Central Florida, and more so in South Florida.

Economy

Lamme and Oldakowski noted that North Florida's economy was much more diversified than Central and South Florida, where tourism was by far the most significant industry. While tourism was a significant factor in North Florida's economy, particularly in the Emerald Coast, other important industries included agriculture in rural areas, education in Tallahassee and Gainesville, and military and finance in Jacksonville.

Major military bases in the region include the Pensacola Naval Air Station, Jacksonville Naval Air Station, Camp Blanding, Naval Station Mayport, Corry Station Naval Technical Training Center, Naval Support Activity Panama City, Blount Island Command, Eglin Air Force Base and Hurlburt Field.

Major attractions include the Big Kahuna's, Marineland of Florida, Florida State Capitol, World Golf Village, Historic Pensacola Village, and historic sites in St. Augustine. North Florida also has a wide variety of natural attractions including the Ravine Gardens State Park, Big Lagoon State Park, Osceola National Forest, and Timucuan Ecological and Historic Preserve. North Florida also has three major zoos, the Jacksonville Zoo and Gardens, St. Augustine Alligator Farm Zoological Park and Gulf Breeze Zoo.

Major malls and shopping districts include The Avenues, Butler Plaza, Five Points, Gateway Town Center, Governor's Square, Jacksonville Landing, The Oaks Mall, Orange Park Mall, Paddock Mall, Pier Park, Regency Square, River City Marketplace, St. Johns Town Center and University Town Plaza.

Major business districts
The following are major central business districts:
 Downtown Jacksonville
 Downtown Pensacola
  Downtown Tallahassee

Notable companies 

Thousands of companies are headquartered in North Florida. Among those, the following 4 are in the Fortune 1000:

Additional notable companies headquartered (or with a significant presence) in North Florida include (some defunct or subsumed):

Parks and other protected areas

National Monuments and other federally protected areas

Areas under federal protection include Castillo de San Marcos National Monument, Fort Matanzas National Monument, Fort Caroline National Memorial, Gulf Islands National Seashore, and Timucuan Ecological and Historic Preserve. National forests occupy large sections of North Florida, including the Apalachicola National Forest, Choctawhatchee National Forest and Osceola National Forest.

Other parks and protected areas

 Waccasassa Bay Preserve State Park
 Paynes Prairie
 Ocala National Forest
 Torreya State Park
 Yellow River Marsh
 George Crady Bridge Fishing Pier State Park
 San Felasco Hammock Preserve State Park
 Faver-Dykes State Park
 O'Leno State Park
 Dunns Creek
 Edward Ball Wakulla Springs State Park
 Cedar Key Scrub State Reserve
 Silver Springs State Park
 Econfina River State Park
 River Rise Preserve State Park
 Tarkiln Bayou
 Bald Point State Park
 Pumpkin Hill Creek Preserve State Park
 St. Marks River State Park
 Ichetucknee Springs State Park
 Grayton Beach State Park
 Ochlockonee River State Park
 Fred Gannon Rocky Bayou State Park
 Orman House
 John Gorrie State Museum
 Dudley Farm
 Perdido Key State Park
 Amelia Island State Park
 Henderson Beach State Park
 Letchworth Mounds Archaeological State Park
 Camp Helen State Park
 Falling Waters State Park
 Eden Gardens State Park
 Gamble Rogers Memorial State Recreation Area
 Natural Bridge Battlefield Historic State Park
 Lake Jackson Mounds Archaeological State Park
 Marjorie Kinnan Rawlings Historic State Park
 Troy Spring State Park
 Devil's Millhopper Geological State Park
 Ravine Gardens State Park
 Olustee Battlefield Historic State Park
 Fort Mose Historic State Park
 Washington Oaks State Gardens
 Cedar Key Museum State Park
 San Marcos de Apalache Historic State Park
 Gainesville-Hawthorne Trail State Park
 Forest Capital Museum State Park
 Constitution Convention Museum State Park
 DeSoto Site Historic State Park
 Madison Blue Springs State Park
 Mike Roess Gold Head Branch State Park
 Deer Lake State Park
 St. George Island State Park
 St. Joseph Peninsula State Park
 Suwannee River State Park
 Topsail Hill Preserve State Park
 Anastasia State Park
 Big Talbot Island State Park
 Fort George Island Cultural State Park
 Little Talbot Island State Park
 Yellow Bluff Fort Historic State Park
 Rainbow Springs State Park
 Fanning Springs State Park
 Fort Clinch State Park
 Florida Caverns State Park
 St. Andrews State Park
 Alfred B. Maclay Gardens State Park
 Stephen Foster Folk Culture Center State Park
 Wes Skiles Peacock Springs State Park
 Big Lagoon State Park
 Lafayette Blue Springs State Park
 Three Rivers State Park
 Blackwater River State Park
 Lake Talquin
 Ponce de Leon Springs State Park

Educational institutions

Public institutions
State University System
 Florida Agricultural and Mechanical University (Tallahassee)
 Florida State University (Tallahassee)
 University of Florida (Gainesville)
 University of North Florida (Jacksonville)
 University of West Florida (Pensacola)

State College System
 Chipola College (Marianna)
 Florida Gateway College (Lake City)
 Florida State College at Jacksonville (Jacksonville)
 Gulf Coast State College (Panama City)
 North Florida Community College (Madison)
 Northwest Florida State College (Niceville)
 Pensacola State College (Pensacola)
 Santa Fe College (Gainesville)
 St. Johns River State College (Palatka)
 Tallahassee Community College (Tallahassee)

Private institutions

(Partial list)
 Edward Waters College (Jacksonville)
 Flagler College (St. Augustine)
 Jacksonville University (Jacksonville)
 Jones College (Jacksonville)
 Mayo Clinic College of Medicine and Science (Jacksonville)

Research institutions

(Partial list)
 Florida Institute for Human and Machine Cognition
 Tall Timbers Research Station and Land Conservancy
 McKinley Climatic Laboratory

Transportation

Airports

The following airports currently have regularly scheduled commercial service:

Rail

 Jacksonville Transportation Authority operates a monorail system known as the Skyway
 Amtrak: Jacksonville Station and Palatka Union Depot are currently the only intercity rail stops in North Florida
 Silver Meteor - Eastern seaboard
 Silver Star - Eastern seaboard
 Sunset Limited - East-west route (suspended since 2005)

Transit organizations
 Escambia County Area Transit
 Gainesville Regional Transit System
 Jacksonville Transportation Authority
 Northeast Florida Regional Transportation Commission
 Okaloosa County Transit
 Ride Solution
 StarMetro

Ferries

 Drayton Island Ferry
 Fort Gates Ferry
 Jacksonville Water Taxi
 Mayport Ferry

Roadways

Interstates:
  Interstate 10
  Interstate 110
  Interstate 75
  Interstate 95
  Interstate 295 (Jacksonville Beltway)

U.S. Routes:

  U.S. Route 1
  U.S. Route 17
  U.S. Route 19
  U.S. Route 23
  U.S. Route 27
  U.S. Route 29
  U.S. Route 41
  U.S. Route 90

  U.S. Route 98
  U.S. Route 129
  U.S. Route 221
  U.S. Route 231
  U.S. Route 301
  U.S. Route 319
  U.S. Route 331
  U.S. Route 441

Notes

References

 
 
 

 
Regions of Florida